Thai League 2, commonly known as the T2, formally called Thai Division 1 League, is the second-tier professional league in the Thai football league system. The top 3 are promoted to Thai League 1 at the end of the season, whilst four are relegated to Thai League 3.

For the 2008 season, the Football Association of Thailand (FAT) reduced the number of teams in the league to 16 teams. Previously there had been two groups of 12 clubs. For the 2011 season the number of teams was increased to 18 teams, The Thai Division 1 League is a season run from March to October, with teams playing 34 games each totalling 306 games in the season. In 2016, the Khǒr Royal Cup became a trophy for Thai Division 1 League. In 2017 the Football Association of Thailand changed the name to Thai League 2. It is sponsored by Osotspa M-150 and therefore officially known as the Thai League 2 M-150 Championship.

Promotion and relegation 
The top three teams will be promoted to the Thai League 1. The top team as champions.

The bottom three teams will be relegated to the Thai League 3.

Championship history

(Champions of the 2nd tier Thai football league system)

Number of wins

Stadiums and locations (2022–23)

Stadiums (2022–23) 
Primary venues used in the Thai League 2:

Awards

Top scorers

Prize money 
 Champion     : 5,000,000 Baht
 Runner-up    : 3,000,000 Baht
 Third Place  : 1,000,000 Baht

See also 
 Football records in Thailand

References

External links
 Official website 
 Football Association of Thailand 
  Thai Division 1 League
  ผลบอลสด บ้านผลบอล ผลบอลวันนี้ 7m 888 Livescore

 
2
Sports leagues established in 1997
1997 establishments in Thailand
Thai
Professional sports leagues in Thailand